Caldera is an 11-minute computer animated short film released in 2012. It was directed by Evan Viera, co-written by Chris Bishop, co-produced by Chris Perry, and created in conjunction with Bit Films, the computer animation incubator program at Hampshire College in Amherst, Massachusetts.

Caldera received a Prix Ars Electronica Award of Distinction in the Computer Animation category in 2012.

Plot 
Caldera is about a young girl who goes off her medication and leaves a bleak metropolis to immerse herself in a vibrant oceanic cove. Ultimately, the story is about the young girl's impossible predicament, where she can not live in either the fantastical and haunting world of psychosis or in the marginalizing society that mandates her medication.

Awards
2012
 Prix Ars Electronica – Award of Distinction (Computer Animation)
 Seattle International Film Festival - Award of Innovation
 Rome Independent Film Festival - Best Short Animation

References

External links 
 
 

2012 films
Computer-animated short films
Animated films without speech
American animated short films
2012 animated films
2010s animated short films
2010s American animated films
2012 short films
2010s English-language films